The 1913–14 season was the second season of FIFA-sanctioned soccer in the United States.

Honors and achievements 

Notes = Number in parentheses is the times that club has won that honor. * indicates new record for competition

National team

Men's 

No men's national team matches were played during the 1913–14 season.

Women's 

The first women's national team match was not played until 1987.

League standings

NAFBL 

The National Association Foot Ball League conducted its eleventh season of play. The Brooklyn Field Club accumulated the most points at the end of the season, thus winning the league title.

2 points for a win, 1 point for a tie, 0 points for a loss.
Source: RSSSF

STLSL 

The seventh season of the St. Louis Soccer League was held. St. Leo's won their sixth-consecutive title that year. The league was split into two divisions; the Federal Park and Robinson League.

Federal Park League

Robison League

Cup Competitions

National Challenge Cup 

The National Challenge Cup, known today as the Lamar Hunt U.S. Open Cup, held its inaugural tournament during the 1913–14 season. Brooklyn Field Club of Brooklyn, New York won the title.

American Cup 

The American Cup, then known as the AFA Cup held its 23rd staging of the competition. Bethlehem Steel won the competition.

References 

 
Seasons in American soccer